Guantánamo is a city and the seat of Guantánamo Province, Cuba

Guantánamo or Guantanamo may also refer to:

 Guantánamo Province in southeastern Cuba
 Guantánamo Bay, a body of water on the south shore of Cuba
 Guantanamo Bay Naval Base, a U.S. military base
 Guantanamo Bay detention camp, a U.S. military prison
 Battle of Guantánamo Bay, 1898
 Guantánamo (baseball), a Cuban professional baseball club
 "Guantanamo", a song by Outlandish from Bread & Barrels of Water, 2002

See also 

 "Guantanamera" (Spanish, 'from Guantánamo'), a Cuban song
 Gitmo (disambiguation)